Pannaxiakos Football Club is a Greek football club, based in Naxos City, Cyclades.

The club was founded in 1960. They currently play in Gamma Ethniki, the fourth tier of the Greek football league system.

Notable former players

Notable former managers
  Noni Lima
  Giorgos Vlastos
  Jovan Mihajlovic
  Dimitris Skounas
  Christos Pelekis

Honors

Domestic Titles and honors
 Cyclades Champions: 7
 1982-83, 1992–93, 1998-99, 2002–03, 2010–11, 2014–15, 2019-20
 Cyclades Cup Winners: 6
 1986-87, 2003–04, 2006–07, 2011–12, 2012–13, 2014–15

See also
 Pannaxiakos V.C.

External links
pannaxiakosfc.blogspot.gr
pannaxiakos-athensclub.gr
el.wikipedia.org
Football clubs in South Aegean
Naxos
1960 establishments in Greece